Sayala, commonly known as "Sayala Khating" is a village located in Parbhani Taluka of Parbhani district, in state of Maharashtra.

Demographics
As per 2011 census:
Sayala Khating has 276 families residing. The village has population of 1465.
Out of the population of 1465, 752 are males while 713 are females. 
Literacy rate of the village is 75.31%.
Average sex ratio of Sayala village is 948 females to 1000 males. Average sex ratio of Maharashtra state is 929.

Geography, and transport

References

Villages in Parbhani district